Brent Jay Spiner (born February 2, 1949) is an American actor. He is best known for his role as the android Data on the television series Star Trek: The Next Generation and four subsequent films. In 2019, he reprised the role for Star Trek: Picard. In 1997, he won the Saturn Award for Best Supporting Actor for his portrayal of Data in Star Trek: First Contact, and was nominated in the same category for portraying Dr. Brackish Okun in Independence Day, a role he reprised in Independence Day: Resurgence. Spiner has also enjoyed a career in the theater and as a musician.

Early life 
Brent Jay Spiner was born on February 2, 1949, in Houston, to Sylvia (née Schwartz) and Jack Spiner, who owned a furniture store. At age 29, Jack Spiner died of kidney failure when his son was ten months old. After his father's death, Spiner was adopted by his mother's second husband, Sol Mintz, whose surname he used between 1955 and 1975.

Spiner attended Bellaire High School in Bellaire, Texas. He became active on the Bellaire speech team, winning the national championship in dramatic interpretation. He attended the University of Houston, where he performed in local theater. In 1968, Spiner worked as a performer at Six Flags Astroworld, first as a gunfighter and later in Dr. Featherflowers Medicine Show with his friend Trey Wilson. Both performers alternated as Dr. Featherflowers. Spiner also performed the role in the 1968 TV special The Pied Piper of Astroworld.

Career

Early work 
Spiner moved to New York City in the early 1970s, where he became a stage actor, performing in several Broadway and off-Broadway plays, including The Three Musketeers and Stephen Sondheim's Sunday in the Park with George. Spiner (as Brent Mintz) appeared as an imposter on a 1972 episode of To Tell the Truth.  He had a brief non-speaking role in the film Stardust Memories, credited as "Fan in Lobby", the one with a Polaroid. He can also be seen as a passenger on the train full of misfits that the Allen character is trapped on in one of the films-within-the-film.

Spiner appeared as a media technician in "The Advocates", a second-season episode of the Showtime cable series The Paper Chase. In 1984, he moved to Los Angeles, where he appeared in several pilots and made-for-TV movies. He played a recurring character on Night Court, Bob Wheeler, patriarch of a rural family. In 1986, he played a condemned soul in "Dead Run", an episode of the revival of Rod Serling's series The Twilight Zone on CBS. He made two appearances in season three (1986) of the situation comedy Mama's Family, playing two different characters. Spiner's first and only starring film role was in Rent Control (1984). In the Cheers episode "Never Love a Goalie, Part II", he played acquitted murder suspect Bill Grand. Spiner also appeared in the Tales from the Darkside episode, "A Case of the Stubborns", as a preacher. He portrayed Jim Stevens in the made-for-TV movie Manhunt for Claude Dallas.

Spiner guest-starred in Friends as James Campbell, a man who interviews Rachel for Gucci.

Star Trek 
In 1987, Spiner started portraying the android Starfleet officer Lieutenant Commander Data on Star Trek: The Next Generation, which spanned seven seasons and four feature films. As a main character, he appeared in all but one of the series' 178 episodes. He reprised his role in the spin-off films Star Trek Generations (1994), Star Trek: First Contact (1996), Star Trek: Insurrection (1998), and Star Trek: Nemesis (2002). Although billed as the final Trek movie for the TNG cast, the ambiguous ending of Star Trek: Nemesis suggested a possible avenue for the return of Data. However, Spiner opined that he was too old to continue playing the part, as Data does not age. He played Lore, the android brother of Data, in several episodes of Star Trek: The Next Generation and another brother of his, B-4, in Star Trek: Nemesis (2002).

In 2004, Spiner returned to Star Trek when he appeared as Dr. Arik Soong, an ancestor of Data's creator Dr. Noonien Soong, whom he also played in a three-episode story arc of Star Trek: Enterprise: "Borderland", "Cold Station 12", and "The Augments".

Spiner also recorded dialogue as Data that was heard in the final episode of Star Trek: Enterprise, "These Are the Voyages...", which aired in 2005.

Eighteen years after last appearing as Data, he reprised the role in the 2020 Star Trek series Star Trek: Picard as well as Dr Altan Inigo Soong, the son of Data's creator Dr Noonien Soong. Spiner has stated that he does not intend to play that role again, though he might be open to playing the role of Altan Soong. In Season 2 he plays another ancestor of Dr Noonien Soong, Dr Adam Soong.

In addition to the series and films, he voiced his character in several Star Trek video games, such as Star Trek: Generations, Star Trek: The Next Generation – A Final Unity, Star Trek: Hidden Evil, and Star Trek: Bridge Commander.

Music and stage 
In 1991, Spiner recorded an album of 1940s pop standards, Ol' Yellow Eyes Is Back, the title of which was a play on the yellow contact lenses Spiner wore as Data, and the title of a Frank Sinatra record, Ol' Blue Eyes Is Back. In 1997, he returned to Broadway, playing John Adams in the Roundabout Theater Company revival of the musical 1776. The production was nominated for a Tony Award. A cast recording was released of the revival production.

After Star Trek 
Spiner has appeared in many television series, including Deadly Games, The Blacklist, Dream On, Gargoyles, Law & Order: Criminal Intent, Mad About You and The Outer Limits. In the series The Big Bang Theory and Joey, he appeared as himself. He has acted in the movies The Aviator; Dude, Where's My Car?; I Am Sam; Independence Day; Independence Day: Resurgence; The Master of Disguise; Out to Sea; Phenomenon; The Ponder Heart; and South Park: Bigger, Longer and Uncut. His television-movie appearances during this period include the 2000 musical Geppetto and the role of Dorothy Dandridge's manager and confidant, Earl Mills, in the HBO production Introducing Dorothy Dandridge.

In 2005, Spiner appeared in a short-lived science-fiction television series Threshold, which was canceled in November of that year after 13 episodes. In 2006, he appeared in a feature film comedy, Material Girls, with Hilary and Haylie Duff.

During the 10th season of the situation comedy Frasier, in the episode "Lilith Needs a Favor", Spiner made two brief cameos as a fellow airline passenger with Frasier Crane's ex-wife, Lilith Sternin.

In March 2008, Spiner performed alongside Maude Maggart in a radio show/musical, Dreamland, which was released as a CD album.

In 2008, Spiner played Dr. Strom in the feature film parody Superhero Movie. In February 2009, he played William Quint in "The Juror #6 Job", an episode of the drama series Leverage directed by his Next Generation co-star Jonathan Frakes. That same year, he voiced himself in the Family Guy episode "Not All Dogs Go to Heaven".

On , Spiner and fellow Star Trek: The Next Generation actor LeVar Burton appeared on TWiT.tv's coverage of the Consumer Electronics Show.

In April 2011, Spiner began starring in Fresh Hell, a comic webseries in which he plays a version of himself, attempting to put his career back together after falling out of the limelight.

Spiner appeared as Dr. Kern in the September 12, 2011, episode of the Syfy channel program Alphas entitled "Blind Spot". In October 2011, he appeared as himself in the episode "The Russian Rocket Reaction" of The Big Bang Theory. The day after his guest appearance, it was announced that Spiner would guest-star in the Young Justice episode "Revelation", providing the voice of the Joker. Spiner has also guest-starred on the Syfy program Warehouse 13 as Brother Adrian in the third and fourth seasons.

Book 
In October 2021, Spiner released Fan Fiction: A Mem-Noir: Inspired by True Events, a mixture of memoir (taking place during the filming of the fourth season of Star Trek: The Next Generation) and a fictitious noir detective story about Spiner dealing with a crazed, murderous fan who claims to be the fictitious Lal, the android daughter of Data in the third-season TNG episode "The Offspring". The audiobook version, primarily narrated by Spiner, featured vocal cameos from Spiner's TNG co-stars, Patrick Stewart, Jonathan Frakes, Michael Dorn, LeVar Burton, Marina Sirtis, and Gates McFadden.

Filmography

Film

Television

Theater

Audiobooks

Discography

References

External links 

 
 
 
 

1949 births
20th-century American male actors
21st-century American male actors
American adoptees
American male film actors
American male television actors
American male voice actors
Jewish American male actors
Living people
University of Houston alumni
Bellaire High School (Bellaire, Texas) alumni
Male actors from Houston
American male stage actors
21st-century American Jews